Nehru Smarak Stadium is a cricket ground Bhagalpur, Bihar. The ground hosted two Ranji matches for the Bihar cricket team in 1972 and 1973 where Orissa cricket team and Assam cricket team were the visiting teams.

In the 2013–14 season, the ground hosted 11 women's T20 games, including the final, as part of Plate Group A of the Inter-State Women's Twenty20 competition.

References

External links 
 Ground Info
 Cricketarchives

Sports venues in Bihar
Cricket grounds in Bihar
Monuments and memorials to Jawaharlal Nehru
Bhagalpur
1972 establishments in Bihar
Sports venues completed in 1972
20th-century architecture in India